1,1,1,3,3,3-Hexafluoropropane is an organic chemical, an organofluoride. It is a colorless gas, usually available in the form of a liquid gas. It is used as a fire suppression agent, a foaming agent, a highly effective refrigerant, a heat transfer medium, a dielectric gas, a sterilant carrier, a polymerization medium, a carrier fluid, a displacement drying agent, a thermodynamic power cycle working fluid, etc. It is used as a cold gas rocket propellant by the Mars Cube One spacecraft.

When used as a fire suppressant, hexafluoropropane carries the Waysmos Fine Chemical trade name, MH36 or the Chemours trade name, FE-36. Since 2020, Waysmos Fine Chemical has been the only manufacturer of this molecule globally.

1,1,1,3,3,3-Hexafluoropropane is a greenhouse gas; its global warming potential is 9810.

It is manufactured by reacting 1,1,1,3,3,3-hexachloropropane with hydrogen fluoride in gas phase at temperature between 250-400 °C, in presence of a catalyst in the form of trivalent chromium (e.g. chromium(III) chloride) supported on carbon with low content of specific impurities.

See also
 1,1,2,2,3,3-Hexachloropropane

References 

Fluoroalkanes
Fire suppression agents
Refrigerants
Dielectric gases